Andrew Anton Schmauch (30 May 1841 - 20 August 1923) was a first sergeant of the United States Army who was awarded the Medal of Honor for gallantry during the American Civil War. He was awarded the medal on 9 July 1864 for actions performed at the Siege of Vicksburg in 1863.

Personal life 
Schmauch was born in Rottenburg am Neckar, Landkreis Tübingen in the Kingdom of Württemberg (modern day Baden-Württemberg, Germany) on 30 May 1841. He married Sophia M. Miller in 1867 and fathered twelve children, of which ten survived to adulthood. Schmauch died on 20 August 1923 in Ashland, Kentucky and was buried in Ashland Cemetery.

Military service 
Schmauch enlisted in the Army as a private on 15 August 1861 in Portsmouth, Ohio and was assigned to Company A of the 30th Ohio Infantry. On 22 May 1863, at the Siege of Vicksburg in Mississippi, Schmauch and approximately 150 other men volunteered to be part of an extremely dangerous storming party whose job it was to build as bridge over a Confederate ditch near Vicksburg while under fire to allow for Union forces to access the town. Approximately half of the men were killed or wounded in the initial charge to the ditch and over the course of the hours long firefight only around 20 were not killed or wounded. For participating in this action, Schmauch was awarded the Medal of Honor.

Schmauch's Medal of Honor citation reads:

Schmauch was subsequently promoted to corporal on 2 March 1864, to sergeant on 22 June 1864, and to first sergeant on 10 August 1864. He was mustered out of the Army on 13 August 1865 at Little Rock, Arkansas.

References 

United States Army Medal of Honor recipients
American Civil War recipients of the Medal of Honor
1841 births
1923 deaths